Lissepipona is a monotypic Indomalayan genus of potter wasps. Its single species (Lissepipona variabilis) is known from Sulawesi.

References

Potter wasps
Monotypic Hymenoptera genera